Epigaea asiatica is a species of Epigaea from Japan. Seeds are dispersed by ants.

Description
Epigaea asiatica is an evergreen shrub up to 0.1 m (0 ft 4 in) by 0.5 m (1 ft 8 in). It is hardy to zone (UK) 4. It is leafy all year round, in flower from April to May. The species is hermaphrodite (has male and female organs).

References

External links
 
 

asiatica